Ausgram Assembly constituency is an assembly constituency in Purba Bardhaman district in the Indian state of West Bengal. It is reserved for scheduled castes.

Overview
As per orders of the Delimitation Commission, No. 273 Ausgram (SC) assembly seat covers Ausgram I and Ausgram II CD Blocks, and Guskara municipality.

Ausgram assembly segment is part of No. 41 Bolpur (Lok Sabha constituency)

Members of Legislative Assembly

Election results

2021
In the 2021 election, Abhedananda Thander of Trinamool Congress defeated his nearest rival Kalita Maji of BJP.

2016
In the 2016 election, Abhedananda Thander of Trinamool Congress defeated his nearest rival Basudeb Mete of CPI (M).

2011
In the 2011 election, Basudeb Mete of CPI(M) defeated his nearest rival Chanchal Kumar Mondol of Congress.

 

.# Swing calculated on Congress+Trinamool Congress vote percentages in 2006 taken together.

1951-1972
Sridhar Malik of CPI(M) won the seat in 1972 and 1971. Krishna Chandra Halder of CPI(M) won it 1969 and 1967. In 1962, it was won by Kanai Lal Das of Congress.  In 1952, the first year when this constituency was formed, and 1957, it had two seats, one general and the other reserved for SC. From 1962, it became a constituency reserved for SC. In 1951, the winners were Ananda Gopal Mukhopadhyay and Kanai Lal Das both of Congress.

1977-2006
Kartick Chandra Bag of CPI(M) won the Ausgram (SC) assembly seat in 2006, 2001 and 1996, defeating his nearest rivals Chhaya Chowdhuri of Trinamool Congress, Sukumar Mondal of Trinamool Congress and Sukumar Saha of Congress, in the respective years. Contests in most years were multi cornered but only winners and runners are being mentioned. Sreedhar Malik of CPI(M) won the seat in 1991, 1987, 1982 and 1977, defeating his nearest rivals, Chhaya Rani Chowdhury of Congress, Biswambhar Mondal of Congress, Chanchal Kumar Modal of Congress and Madan Lohar of Janata Party, in the respective years.

References

Assembly constituencies of West Bengal
Politics of Purba Bardhaman district
1952 establishments in West Bengal
Constituencies established in 1952